Ashtead may refer to:

Ashtead, Surrey
 Ashtead, a village in Surrey, England.
 Ashtead Common, a wood to the north of Ashtead. 
 Ashtead Park, a park at Ashtead in Surrey.
 Ashtead railway station, a railway station in Surrey.

Companies associated with Ashtead, Surrey
 Ashtead Group, a British industrial equipment rental company.
 Ashtead potters, a former pottery company that operated from 1923 to 1935.

See also
 Ashted, an area of Birmingham